George Hugh Hadfield (16 July 1880 – 30 November 1935) was an English first-class cricketer active 1902–06 who played for Surrey. He was born in Edmonton, Middlesex; died in Lambeth.

References

1880 births
1935 deaths
English cricketers
Surrey cricketers
W. G. Grace's XI cricketers